Petrophila schaefferalis is a moth in the family Crambidae. It was described by Harrison Gray Dyar Jr. in 1906. It is found in Mexico (Xalapa) and the southern United States, where it has been recorded from Arizona, California and Texas.

The wingspan is 17–20 mm for males and 24–29 mm for females. Adults have been recorded on wing from April to September.

The larvae are aquatic.

References

Petrophila
Moths described in 1906